Ida is a village in Caddo Parish, Louisiana, United States. The population was 221 at the 2010 census. It is part of the Shreveport–Bossier City Metropolitan Statistical Area. Ida and nearby Rodessa are the most northwesterly communities in Louisiana.

Geography
Ida is located in Caddo Parish, just south of the Arkansas border. US 71 runs through the village, leading north  to Texarkana, AR, and south  to Shreveport. I-49 runs parallel to US 71 between the two cities and bypasses Ida just to west with one exit serving the village, Exit 245 (LA 168).

Demographics

As of the census of 2000, there were 258 people, 117 households, and 80 families residing in the village. The racial makeup of the village was 97.67% White, 1.55% African American, 0.39% Native American, and 0.39% from two or more races. Hispanic or Latino of any race were 0.39% of the population.

There were 117 households, out of which 21.4% had children under the age of 18 living with them, 62.4% were married couples living together, 5.1% had a female householder with no husband present, and 30.8% were non-families. 28.2% of all households were made up of individuals, and 12.0% had someone living alone who was 65 years of age or older. The average household size was 2.21 and the average family size was 2.70.

In the village, the population was spread out, with 20.5% under the age of 18, 5.0% from 18 to 24, 21.3% from 25 to 44, 29.5% from 45 to 64, and 23.6% who were 65 years of age or older. The median age was 46 years. For every 100 females, there were 92.5 males. For every 100 females age 18 and over, there were 89.8 males.

The median income for a household in the village was $26,667, and the median income for a family was $32,778. Males had a median income of $24,375 versus $20,781 for females. The per capita income for the village was $14,166. About 21.1% of families and 22.0% of the population were below the poverty line, including 30.4% of those under the age of eighteen and 19.7% of those 65 or over.

Sites of interest
The Capt. Fletcher E. Adams United States Air Force 357th Fighter Group Museum occupies the former W. C. Reynolds Building on East Magnolia Avenue in the center of town. Adams was a World War II flying ace. The Reynolds building was the Ida post office from 1923 to 1962, then in 1997 became the Ida Museum. In 2010 it acquired its current name.

References

Villages in Caddo Parish, Louisiana
Villages in Louisiana
Villages in Shreveport – Bossier City metropolitan area